"No Smoke" is a song written by John McLaughlin, Alan Ross, and Dave James. It was recorded by British singer Michelle Lawson for her 2003 debut album I Just Wanna Say. The song has since been recorded by several artists, including Canadian singer Eva Avila, English singer Nicki French (as "Aint No Smoke (Without Fire)"), and German girl group Queensberry, and Belgian singer Esther Sels, who recorded a Flemish version under the title "Game Over".

Queensberry version

In 2008, "No Smoke" served as the first promotional single by German girl group Queensberry. Their rendition was released along with ballad "I Can't Stop Feeling" on the band's debut single on February 20, 2009 following their formation on the ProSieben reality television show Popstars – Just 4 Girls. It reached number 22 on the Swiss Singles Chart.

Formats and track listings

Charts

References

2003 songs
2008 singles
Queensberry (band) songs
Warner Records singles